Michael P. Shawver (born ) is an American film editor who is known for his collaboration with director Ryan Coogler. Shawver and fellow editor Debbie Berman collaborated on Coogler's 2018 film Black Panther. Before Black Panther, Shawver and Claudia Castello collaborated in editing Coogler's films Fruitvale Station (2013) and Creed (2015).

Background
He went to Greystone Elementary School then Ponaganset High School. He went to the University of Rhode Island, where he majored in communications studies. He graduated from URI in 2007, and he then went to the Los Angeles-based USC School of Cinematic Arts to enroll in the Master of Fine Arts program. He met Ryan Coogler in 2009 in a directing class, learned about Coogler's short films in the making, and asked to help edit them. Shawver edited Coogler's student films, including "Fig", which aired on HBO. Shawver completed the MFA program in 2012.

Shawver's first feature-film credit as editor came when Coogler began work on his first feature film Fruitvale Station with Claudia Castello involved as editor. Coogler recruited Shawver, and Castello and Shawver worked as a team. The two collaborated as editors again for Coogler's follow-up Creed. For Coogler's third feature film Black Panther, Shawver teamed with Debbie Berman, and the two worked on editing over 500 hours' worth of footage. Since Berman was one of the editors for the 2017 film Spider-Man: Homecoming, Shawver learned from her how to work with visual effects in editing.

Filmography

See also
List of University of Rhode Island people

References

External links

1980s births

Living people

Year of birth uncertain
American film editors

University of Rhode Island alumni
USC School of Cinematic Arts alumni
People from North Providence, Rhode Island